All Time Greatest Movie Songs is a joint effort with Columbia Records of Sony Music UK to release movie compilations in 1999.

Track listing
"My Heart Will Go On" (Titanic) - Celine Dion
"Men in Black" (Men in Black) - Will Smith
"The Sweetest Thing" (Love Jones) - Refugee Camp All-Stars featuring Lauryn Hill
"I Say a Little Prayer" (My Best Friend's Wedding) - Diana King
"Streets of Philadelphia" (Philadelphia) - Bruce Springsteen
"As I Lay Me Down" (Now and Then) - Sophie B. Hawkins
"Go the Distance" (Hercules) - Michael Bolton
"Heaven's What I Feel" (Dance with Me) - Gloria Estefan
"A Whole New World" (Aladdin) - Peabo Bryson and Regina Belle
"For the First Time" (One Fine Day) - Kenny Loggins
"I Want to Spend My Lifetime Loving You" (The Mask of Zorro) - Marc Anthony and Tina Arena
"I Finally Found Someone" (The Mirror Has Two Faces) - Barbra Streisand and Bryan Adams
"Modern Woman" (Ruthless People) - Billy Joel
"You Were There" (Simon Birch) - Babyface
"Will You Be There" (Free Willy) - Michael Jackson
"I'm Kissing You" (Romeo + Juliet) - Des'ree
"Heart of a Hero" (Hero) - Luther Vandross

Certifications

References

Soundtrack compilation albums
1999 compilation albums
Columbia Records compilation albums